Shallum of Israel ( Šallūm, "retribution", fl. mid-8th century BC), was the fifteenth king of the ancient Kingdom of Israel, and the son of Jabesh. The Shallum dynasty, or the House of Shallum was an ephemeral dynasty, represented only by Shallum (reigned 752 BCE).

In the Bible 

Originally a captain in the army of King Zechariah, Shallum "conspired against Zechariah, and smote him before the people; and slew him, and reigned in his stead". He reigned only "a month of days in Samaria" before Menahem—another captain from Zechariah's army—rose up and put Shallum to death. Menahem then became king in Shallum's stead.

In the Books of Kings (2 Kings, Chapter 15, verses 10, 13-14) Shallum's father is identified as Jabesh. However, the passage may instead mention a toponym, identifying that Shallum was "the son" of a city called Jabesh. In this view, Shallum may have originated from Jabesh-Gilead. The city is mentioned several times in the Biblical texts. In the Book of Judges (Chapter 21), the male inhabitants of the city are murdered and their virgin girls are given as brides to the men of the Tribe of Benjamin.

In the Books of Samuel, Jabesh-Gilead is under siege by Nahash of Ammon and his army. The siege is lifted when Saul leads an Israelite army to rescue the city. The victory allows Saul to be recognized as the legitimate King of Israel, as his claim to the throne was previously rejected. When Saul died, his corpse was taken by the Philistines and hung from the city walls of Beth-shan. The men of Jabesh-Gilead eventually managed to retrieve the corpses of Saul and his sons. The city cremated the corpses and buried their bones.

In Antiquities of the Jews 
Josephus primarily uses the inflected form of the name: "Sellëmos". The name of Jabesh, Shallum's father, is Hellenized to "Jabësos".

Contradicting the Bible, Josephus depicts Shallum as a friend of his predecessor Zechariah of Israel. Josephus intentionally heightens the pathos (suffering) of Zechariah's assassination, by depicting him betrayed and killed by a friend.  Josephus similarly depicts Jehoash of Judah and Amaziah of Judah as victims of assassination by their respective friends. 

Josephus simply mentions no location for the event. 

In Josephus' narrative, Shallum murders Zechariah, seizes power over Israel, and reigns for thirty days. In this position, the Biblical sources speak of a fulfilled prophecy, that the House of Jehu (represented by Zechariah) would only reign for four generations. Josephus omits any reference to this supposed prophecy. Josephus similarly omits Biblical information that Shallum's seat of power was the city of Samaria, and that Shallum rose to the throne during the 39th regnal year of Uzziah, monarch of the Kingdom of Judah.  Josephus has a tendency to abridge the narratives concerning the final few monarchs of Israel, with full-length narratives reserved only for Menahem and Hoshea. 

Josephus' narrative next introduces Menahem under the Hellenized name Manaëmos (. He is identified with the Greek title of strategos, translating to general officer. In Josephus' narrative, Menahem is depicted as a general whose seat of power was the city of "Tharsë" (identified with the city of Tirzah. 

In the narrative, Menahem hears news that Zechariah has been assassinated, and then brings his entire army to Samaria to face Shallum. Josephus thus givers both a more detailed and a more plausible account of the event than the Biblical texts, where Menahem is seemingly acting alone.

History 
William F. Albright has dated his reign to 745 BC, while Hooker says 747. E.R. Thiele offers the date 752 BC.

References

Sources 

8th-century BC Kings of Israel
8th-century BC murdered monarchs
Biblical murder victims
752 BC deaths
House of Shallum
Biblical murderers
Dethroned monarchs
Male murder victims